Mandritsara is a town and commune in Madagascar. It belongs to the district of Betafo, which is a part of Vakinankaratra Region. The population of the commune was estimated to be approximately 13,000 in 2001 commune census.

Only primary schooling is available. The majority 80% of the population of the commune are farmers, while an additional 20% receives their livelihood from raising livestock. The most important crops are rice and potatoes, while other important agricultural products are beans, maize and soya.

References and notes 

Populated places in Vakinankaratra